Alaska Day is a legal holiday in the U.S. state of Alaska, observed on October 18. It is the anniversary of the formal transfer of territories in present-day Alaska from the Russian Empire to the United States, which occurred on Friday, October 18, 1867.

Background

On March 30, 1867, the United States purchased Alaska from the Russian Empire for the sum of $7.2 million. It was not until October of that year that the commissioners arrived in Sitka and the formal transfer was arranged. The formal flag-raising took place at Fort Sitka on October 18, 1867. The original ceremony included 250 United States Army troops, who marched to the governor's house at "Castle Hill". Here the Russian soldiers lowered the Russian flag and the U.S. flag was raised.

The official account of the affair as presented by General Lovell Rousseau to Secretary of State William H. Seward: 

Due to the 11-hour time difference between Sitka and St. Petersburg, and the fact that Russia still used the Julian calendar, the date is sometimes given as Saturday, October 7.

Observance

Alaska's territorial legislature declared Alaska Day a holiday in 1917.  It is a paid holiday for state employees. Annual celebration is held in Sitka, where schools release students early, many businesses close for the day, and events such as a parade and reenactment of the flag raising are held.

It should not be confused with Seward's Day, the last Monday in March, another state holiday which commemorates the signing of the treaty for the Alaska Purchase in which the U.S. purchased Alaska from Russia on March 30, 1867.

Protest
Alaska Day is protested by some Alaska Native people, who view the holiday as a celebration of the violence used to take their land away.  Native organizers assert that the land was not Russia's to sell in the first place, therefore the sale of the land to the U.S. is illegitimate. Even despite being a holiday tradition in Alaska and October 18th being marked the day Russia transferred Alaska to the United States, many of the Alaska Natives have argued about the holiday as cultural genocide  and there is a chance of healing in time. Peter Bradley had given an idea about resolution that call for the re-naming of Alaska Day to Reconciliation Day. That since spread from social media and word of mouth.

References

Annual events in Alaska
State holidays in the United States
October observances
1917 establishments in Alaska
Recurring events established in 1917